The 1941 West Dorset by-election was held on 21 June 1941.  The by-election was held due to the resignation of the incumbent Conservative MP, Philip Colfox.  It was won by the Conservative candidate Simon Wingfield Digby.

References

1941 in England
1941 elections in the United Kingdom
By-elections to the Parliament of the United Kingdom in Dorset constituencies
20th century in Dorset
Unopposed by-elections to the Parliament of the United Kingdom in English constituencies